Zuckertia is a genus of plant of the family Euphorbiaceae first described as a genus in 1858. It contains only one known species, Zuckertia cordata, native to southern Mexico and Central America.

References

Monotypic Euphorbiaceae genera
Plukenetieae
Flora of Southern Mexico
Flora of Central America
Taxa named by Henri Ernest Baillon